Qualea tessmannii is a species of tree that is part of the family Vochysiaceae.

It can be found in countries like Brazil, Bolivia, and Peru.

References

tessmannii